People with the given name Tully include:

 Alexander Hamilton, known by the pen name Tully, wrote editorials denouncing the instigators of the Whiskey Rebellion
 Tully Banta-Cain, American football player
 Tully Bevilaqua, Australian professional basketball player
 Tully Blanchard, American professional wrestler
 Tully Jensen, model
 Tully Kearney, English swimmer
 Tully Marshall, American actor
 Tully Satre, American gay rights activist

See also 
 
 List of people with surname Tully
 Tully (disambiguation)

Tully